Safire are an illusion act based in North Wales, in the UK. The act consists of Stuart Loughland and Libby Edwards.

Highlights of their career include receiving an invitation from world famous illusionists Siegfried and Roy to appear in their World Magic Show at the Tropicana Hotel in Las Vegas, and also performing at the 20th Century Fox Plaza Hotel in Los Angeles. They have also performed in a Royal Variety Performance at The Prince of Wales Theatre in London's West End, entertained Prince Luitpold of Bavaria, appeared at many theatres around the world and have also performed on many cruise ships.

Safire have appeared with BBC's Chuckle Brothers on 14 UK theatre tour, playing parts, performing a giant UV puppet act, "The Magic Light Puppets” and also presenting their illusions. They also built and constructed illusions, set, special effects and puppets for the later tours.

In the 80's Stuart was a member of Colwyn Bay Heavy Rock Band Nitelyne, contributing vocals and keyboards. The band featured on Ebony Records' Heavy Metal Collection Vol. 3 with their original song, "Winners or Losers", for which Stuart wrote the lyrics. Two of their original tracks are on YouTube.

Safire's TV appearances have included CITV, Sooty, Talk of the Town and The Pyjama Party with Claudia Winkleman. They also have appeared on Granada TV's Christmas Special with Noddy Holder and the cast of Coronation Street, and on three Chuckle Brothers DVDs.

Performing close up table magic and large-scale illusions, Safire's corporate clients include Virgin, Barclaycard, Channel 4, Sky TV,  Nat West, BUPA, Hilton, Jaguar and Mercedes.

Stuart also works as an illusion consultant for stage and TV and recently advised on Bradley Walsh's ITV Variety at The London Palladium for Joe Pasquale.

The couple also run Magic Light Productions and have produced and directed nine sell out pantomimes at Theatr Colwyn and four successful theatre tours around the UK.

References 

British magicians